Uruguay has competed in four Rugby World Cup tournaments: 1999, 2003, 2015 and 2019.

A huge success for them was qualifying for the 1999 Rugby World Cup in Wales. They won their pool fixture against Spain, finishing third in their pool.

They qualified for the World Cup again in 2003, and won their pool fixture against Georgia, 24–12.

Uruguay's qualification for the 2007 World Cup started in Americas Round 3a, where they were pooled with Argentina and Chile. After losing their first match 26 points to nil to Argentina, they defeated Chile 43-15 in Montevideo, which saw them enter Round 4, where they faced the USA. Uruguay lost on aggregate, and moved on to the repechage round as Americas 4. They played Portugal over two legs - losing the first in Lisbon and winning the second in Montevideo. Portugal qualified on aggregate points.
They again failed to qualify for the 2011 Rugby World Cup final tournament.

Uruguay qualified for the 2015 Rugby World Cup. They did not win any games during the tournament.

Uruguay qualified for the 2019 Rugby World Cup and won their opening game against Fiji 30-27.

By number of appearances

1999 Rugby World Cup (Pool A)

2003 Rugby World Cup (Pool C)

2007 Rugby World Cup
Did not qualify.

2011 Rugby World Cup
Did not qualify.

2015 Rugby World Cup
During 2015 Rugby World Cup qualifying, Uruguay won the 2013 South American Rugby Championship "A", getting wins at the Estadio Charrúa against Brazil (58–7) and Chile (23–9). In March 2014, Uruguay faced the United States in a NACRA-CONSUR playoff for the last Americas qualification spot. Uruguay tied the home leg 27–27, but lost the away leg 32–13. Uruguay then moved to the repechage, where it defeated Hong Kong 28–3 at the Estadio Charrúa, to face Russia for the 20th and final spot at the 2015 Rugby World Cup. Uruguay qualified for the 2015 Rugby World Cup by defeating Russia by an aggregate score of 57–49 in the two-game series, winning the second game at home 36–27 in front of 14,000 fans at the Charrua Stadium.

Uruguay played in Pool A. The pool was composed of hosts England, as well as the third- and fourth-placed teams from 2011, Australia and Wales. They were joined by one qualifier, Fiji. The group has been called the 'group of death'. Uruguay lost all their pool matches without any bonus points.

2019 Rugby World Cup
Uruguay qualified by beating Canada over two legs. Uruguay play in Pool D. They are joined by Australia, Wales, Georgia and Fiji. Uruguay won their first match of the pool, which was 30 – 27 against Fiji.

Overall Record

Team Records

Most Points in a Tournament
60 (2019 in )
56 (2003 in )
42 (1999 in )
30 (2015 in )

Most Points in a Game
30 vs  (2019)
27 vs  (1999)
24 vs  (2003)
15 vs  (2015)
13 vs  (2003)
13 vs  (2003)

Biggest Winning Margin
12 vs  (1999)
12 Vs  (2003)
3 vs  (2019)

Highest Score Against
111 vs  (2003)
72 vs  (2003)
65 vs  (2015)
60 vs  (2003)
60 vs  (2015)

Biggest Losing Margin
98 vs  (2003)
66 vs  (2003)
62 vs  (2015)
57 vs  (2015)
47 vs  (2003)

Most Tries in a Game
3 vs  (1999)
3 vs  (2003)
3 vs  (2019)
2 vs  (2003)
2 vs  (2015)

Individual Records
Most Appearances 
8 Agustín Ormaechea  ( 2015,  2019)
8 Andrés Vilaseca  ( 2015,  2019)
8 Juan Manuel Gaminara  ( 2015,  2019)
8 Rodrigo Silva  ( 2015,  2019)

Most Points Overall
45 Felipe Berchesi  ( 2015, 2019)
30 Diego Aguirre  ( 1999,  2003)
18 Juan Menchaca   ( 1999,  2003)
10 Alfonso Cardoso  ( 1999,  2003)
10 Pablo Lemoine  ( 1999,  2003)
10 Manuel Diana  ( 2019)

Most Points in a Game
15 vs  - Felipe Berchesi  ( 2019)
9 vs  - Diego Aguirre  ( 1999)
9 vs  - Felipe Berchesi  ( 2015)
8 vs  - Juan Menchaca  ( 2003)
8 vs  - Felipe Berchesi  ( 2019)

Most Tries Overall
2 Pablo Lemoine  ( 1999,  2003)
2 Alfonso Cardoso  ( 1999,  2003)
2 Manuel Diana  ( 2019)

Most Penalty Goals
11 Felipe Berchesi  ( 2015, 2019)
8 Diego Aguirre   ( 1999,  2003)
3 Juan Menchaca   ( 1999,  2003)
 
Most Penalty Goals in a Game
3 vs  - Diego Aguirre ( 1999)
3 vs  - Felipe Berchesi ( 2015)
3 vs  - Felipe Berchesi ( 2019)
2 vs  - Juan Menchaca ( 2003)
2 vs  - Diego Aguirre ( 2003)
2 vs  - Felipe Berchesi ( 2019)

References

 Davies, Gerald (2004) The History of the Rugby World Cup (Sanctuary Publishing Ltd,
 Farr-Jones, Nick, (2003). Story of the Rugby World Cup, Australian Post Corporation,

Rugby World Cup by nation
World Cup